Esteban Gabriel Rueda (born 28 January 1996) is an Argentine professional footballer who plays as a forward for Primera Nacional side San Telmo.

Career
Rueda's career got underway with Argentinos Juniors of Primera B Nacional in 2016. He made his professional debut on 17 October versus Ferro Carril Oeste and scored his first career goal in the process, getting the first goal in a 3–1 win. Three appearances later, he signed a new contract with the club. Overall, Rueda played fifteen times in the 2016–17 Primera B Nacional which ended with Argentinos winning the title.

Career statistics
.

Honours
Argentinos Juniors
Primera B Nacional: 2016–17

References

External links

1996 births
Living people
Footballers from Rosario, Santa Fe
Argentine footballers
Association football forwards
Primera Nacional players
Argentine Primera División players
Argentinos Juniors footballers
San Telmo footballers